Langabad (also Romanized as Langābād; also known as Nāşerābād) is a village in Nakhlestan Rural District, in the Central District of Kahnuj County, Kerman Province, Iran. At the 2006 census, its population was 521, in 107 families.

References 

Populated places in Kahnuj County